The Embassy of Equatorial Guinea in Washington, D.C. is the diplomatic mission of the Republic of Equatorial Guinea to the United States. It is located at 2020 16th Street Northwest, Washington, D.C. in the U Street Corridor neighborhood.

The ambassador is Miguel Ntutumu Evuna Andeme.

Building
Constructed in 1910, the Italianate building is a contributing property to the Sixteenth Street Historic District.

Notable past owners of the building include the government of Taiwan (office of the military attaché; Chinese National Relief and Rehabilitation Administration office) and the government of Spain (embassy and residence of Juan Riaño y Gayangos).

Its 2009 property value was estimated at $1,492,110.

See also
Equatorial Guinea–United States relations

References

External links
 
 Official website

Equatorial Guinea
Washington, D.C.
Equatorial Guinea–United States relations